Zarn may refer to:

Tim de Zarn (born 1952), American actor
Zarn Sullivan (born 2000), New Zealand rugby player
"The Zarn", an episode of Land of the Lost
The Zarn family, characters from the 1997 TV film A Nightmare Come True

Disambiguation pages with given-name-holder lists
Disambiguation pages with surname-holder lists